This is a list of fossiliferous stratigraphic units in Quebec, Canada.

References

 

Quebec
Geology of Quebec